Gents is a novel by Warwick Collins first published in 1997. It is set in the unlikely environment of a "Gentlemen's" toilet, somewhere in London.

The story describes the lives of three West Indian immigrants who run a public urinal in London. Collins claimed it was stimulated in part by his memories of apartheid when he lived as a child in South Africa. The New York Times reviewer wrote: "Mr. Collins is able to express, deftly, several contrasting views of homosexuality. ..., resolves to make up his own mind about alternative life styles and does precisely that, with a mixture of love and logic."

Footnotes

1990s LGBT novels
1997 British novels
Afro-Caribbean culture in London
Black British literature
Novels set in London
Novels with gay themes